Strophanthus boivinii, the wood shaving flower, is a species of plant in the family Apocynaceae. 

The Latin specific epithet of boivinii refers to French explorer and plant collector Louis Hyacinthe Boivin (1808-1852).

Description
Its flowers feature a yellow-orange turning reddish-brown corolla tube.

Distribution and habitat
Strophanthus boivinii is endemic to Madagascar. Its habitat is deciduous forests and thickets, from sea-level to  altitude.

Uses
Strophanthus boivinii is locally used in traditional medicinal treatments for gonorrhoea, colic, wounds and itches.

References

boivinii
Plants used in traditional African medicine
Endemic flora of Madagascar
Plants described in 1888
Taxa named by Henri Ernest Baillon